Lardo is a type of salumi made by curing strips of fatback with rosemary and other herbs and spices.

The most famous lardo is from the Tuscan hamlet of Colonnata, where lardo has been made since Roman times. Colonnata is a frazione of the larger city of Carrara, which is famous for its marble; Colonnata is itself a site where Carrara marble is quarried and, traditionally, lardo is cured for months in basins made of this marble. Lardo di Colonnata is now included in the Ark of Taste catalog of heritage foods as well as enjoying IGP (Protected Geographical Indication) status since 2004. It is composed of over 90% lipids.

Another prized form of lardo is the Valle d'Aosta Lard d'Arnad, a PDO product from the area of Arnad in Aosta Valley of northwest Italy. Both superior types of lardo may be served very thinly sliced as an antipasto.

In popular culture
In the fantasy novel Faith of the Fallen, Terry Goodkind includes lardo, as well as a nearly complete description of its curing and preparation in the Colonnata style.

See also 
 Salo (food), a similar Slavic food

References

External links 
 

Salumi
Lunch meat
Italian cuisine
Cuisine of Tuscany
Italian products with protected designation of origin
Culinary Heritage of Switzerland